Maubec is a commune in the Vaucluse department in the Provence-Alpes-Côte d'Azur region in southeastern France.

Geography
The river Calavon flows westward through the northern part of the commune.

See also
 Côtes du Luberon AOC
Communes of the Vaucluse department
Luberon

References

Communes of Vaucluse